is a passenger railway station  located in the city of Kawanishi, Hyōgo Prefecture, Japan. It is operated by the private transportation company Nose Electric Railway.

Lines

Station layout
The station consists of two opposed side platforms, connected by an underground passage. Only stairs are installed from the ticket gate to the platform, and there is no elevator, and the station is therefore is not barrier-free. The effective length of both platforms is for six cars, but normally only 3-car or 4-car trains are used. The 8-car limited express Hinase Express does not stop at this station.

Adjacent stations

History
Ichinotorii Station opened on April 13, 1913.

Passenger statistics
In fiscal 2019, the station was used by an average of 805 passengers daily

Surrounding area
Japan National Route 173

See also
List of railway stations in Japan

References

External links 

 Ichinotorii Station official home page 

Railway stations in Hyōgo Prefecture
Stations of Nose Electric Railway
Railway stations in Japan opened in 1913
Kawanishi, Hyōgo